Malik Dixon (born September 7, 1975) is an American former professional basketball player. He was the top scorer in the 2005 Israel Basketball Premier League.

He currently resides in Sydney, and plays amateur basketball at Australia.

References

External links 
 Ficha en LEGA BASKET SERIE A
 Ficha en LEGA DUE
 Ficha en FEB.ES
 TBLStat.net Profile

1975 births
Living people
American expatriate basketball people in Croatia
American expatriate basketball people in France
American expatriate basketball people in Greece
American expatriate basketball people in Israel
American expatriate basketball people in Italy
American expatriate basketball people in the Netherlands
American expatriate basketball people in Spain
American expatriate basketball people in Turkey
American expatriate basketball people in Venezuela
American men's basketball players
Basketball players from Chicago
CB Breogán players
Dakota Wizards (CBA) players
Den Helder Kings players
Galatasaray S.K. (men's basketball) players
Guaros de Lara (basketball) players
Hapoel Holon players
KK Zadar players
Limoges CSP players
Little Rock Trojans men's basketball players
Maccabi Haifa B.C. players
Maccabi Rishon LeZion basketball players
Pallacanestro Biella players
Pallacanestro Pavia players
Panellinios B.C. players
Point guards